The 2007–08 Süper Lig season, (also known as the Turkcell Süper Lig for sponsorship reasons), was the 50th anniversary of top-flight professional football in Turkey. It was won by Galatasaray, who won their 17th championship.

Since Turkey had climbed from 15th to 14th position in the UEFA association coefficient rankings at the end of the 2006–07 season, and UEFA Champions League-bound Zenit Saint Petersburg won the 2007–08 UEFA Cup, the domestic cup winner, Kayserispor, which had qualified for the second qualifying round of the 2008–09 UEFA Cup, was promoted to the first round, filling the unused title holder spot.

The league began on 10 August 2007 with the İstanbul B.B.–Fenerbahçe match at Atatürk Olympic Stadium.

The three relegated clubs would be replaced by three promoted clubs from the Bank Asya 1. Lig. Gençlerbirliği OFTAŞ and İstanbul B.B. both earned automatic promotion, while Altay, Diyarbakırspor, Kasımpaşa and Malatyaspor played in the play-off tournament with Kasımpaşa coming out victorious, becoming the third and last club to be promoted to the Süper Lig for 2007–08.

Events

Matchday 1
The league started with a surprise result, with İstanbul B.B. defeating giants Fenerbahçe 2–0. Another important event of the first week was the record of Hakan Şükür. By scoring two goals, he managed to reach to the record of the most goals scored domestically. The Trabzonspor–Sivasspor match was suspended due to "player and fan trouble", just minutes before the referee would end it. The Federation ultimately awarded a default 3–0 victory to Sivasspor. This caused a harsh opposition from the Trabzonspor side.

Matchday 7
The first derby of the season was the main event of this week but the decision of Karl Heinz Feldkamp became the center of the discussion rather than the match between Galatasaray and Beşiktaş because he decided to exclude two important players of his team, Şükür and Lincoln, from the match squad. The reason was their disciplinary problems. This week is also worth mentioning because none of the matches ended with a draw.

Matchday 10
Fenerbahçe, after collecting five points in three Champions League matches, faced the newcomer of the league, Kasımpaşa. Fenerbahçe hardly won the game which they were expected to dominate. On the other field of the competition, Galatasaray secured the victory in the last minutes and the surprise leader of the 9th Week, Sivasspor, was defeated by the desperate Konyaspor. One of the key events of the week was the transfer of Ersun Yanal, former national team manager, to Trabzonspor. Ziya Doğan left his seat after the shocking defeat at the hands of Beşiktaş in the 9th week where Trabzonspor lost its early advantage of 2–0 and ended up losing the game 2–3.

Matchday 24
Beşiktaş hosted Galatasaray on their 319th randez-vous. Both teams had critical absences such as injured Bobo and suspended Lincoln. Beşiktaş won the game with final score of 1–0. Mert Nobre have scored to Galatasaray for the 6th time in his career as he already scored 3 whilst his Fenerbahçe spelling. Nobre could only score once in the first half of the season, then he accelerated his form and earned 6 goals until 24th week. Thereby, Beşiktaş captured the top of table after 137 weeks of the league. Almost entire Beşiktaş squad and board including chairman Yıldırım Demirören and coach Ertuğrul Sağlam had achieved the top position of the league for the very first time in their personal careers; squad exceptions were Serdar Özkan, Gökhan Zan, and captain İbrahim Üzülmez.

Matchday 28
The most important match up of the weekend was between Beşiktaş and Fenerbahçe. Sarı Kanaryalar had already captured the leadership previous week, Beşiktaş was on target to overtake them again as the home side winner on last 6 weeks.

Fenerbahçe started the match well with the header of Alex after Colin Kazım-Richards' cross from the right side. Kazım will have been to score against Chelsea on next match in Champions League. Beşiktaş equalized the scoresheet with Serdar Özkan's goal; however, Alex closed the curtain with his second goal as he became the man of the match. This was a big impact on Beşiktaş due to the victory of Sivasspor as they even lost the second place which they would lose the chance to join Champions League next season. During the match, Yıldırım Demirören's mother got feel faint, it was diagnosed that she had a sudden hypertension. Demirören had to leave the match in early minutes. Alex was protested by Beşiktaş supporters after manipulated the situations during the corner kicks. The referee had added 4 and 8 minutes of stoppage time, sum of 12.

Galatasaray was fined by TFF and played against Gaziantepspor with no audience. This was the 6th match without the supporters this season due to be disciplined; nevertheless Cimbom was able to win 5 times that far. They had a 0–0 draw with Gaziantep.

Matchday 29
Turkish Professional Discipline Board fined Beşiktaş for two matches, one to play in a neutral stadium and one with no audience due to manifestations consisting oaths on TFF and the referees in the match against Fenerbahçe previous weekend.

The most unexpected news was the resignation of Karl-Heinz Feldkamp from Galatasaray. Club officials declared that the reason was the opinion gap between Feldkamp and club board. On the later emerging news on the papers, it was claimed that the very last reason was Feldkamp's tactical changes on the team and selection before the match against Gençlerbirliği which did not consist Hakan Şükür, Hasan Şaş and Okan Buruk.

Sivasspor hosted Beşiktaş as Fenerbahçe did for Kayserispor in the very crucial encounters of the weekend. Galatasaray was the guest of Gençlerbirliği. All three matches finished with narrow scores, therefore Fenerbahçe kept going as the leader. Lincoln was the scorer for Cimbom.

İstanbul B.B. manager Abdullah Avcı was linked with Galatasaray after his successful performance throughout the season.

Former Beşiktaş player Pascal Nouma was in Turkey to follow the Beşiktaş' match as he claimed that his former team to reach the title at the end of the season.

Matchday 31
Kasımpaşa were relegated to Bank Asya 1. Lig, after their away match loss against Bursaspor with a 1–0 score.

Matchday 32
At the biggest game of the season, Galatasaray defeated Fenerbahçe 1–0 at the Ali Sami Yen Stadium and went three points clear at the top of the table. Çaykur Rizespor were relegated to Bank Asya 1. Lig, after their away match loss against Kayserispor with a 3–0 score.

Matchday 33
Manisaspor Vestel Manisaspor were relegated to Bank Asya 1. Lig following a home loss against relegated Kasımpaşa with a 2–1 score. Galatasaray defeated Sivasspor 5–3 at an away match and took a big step to the title. Fenerbahçe defeated Gençlerbirliği 3–2 at home and guaranteed UEFA Champions League qualification.

Matchday 34
Galatasaray won their 17th championship after defeating Gençlerbirliği OFTAŞ 2–0. Fenerbahçe finished in second position after losing 2–0 to Trabzonspor. Beşiktaş finished in third position, securing a UEFA Cup spot, after winning 5–1 against relegated Vestel Manisaspor. Sivasspor won 2–0 against Gençlerbirliği, but could only qualify for UEFA Intertoto Cup after finishing in fourth, behind Fenerbahçe and Beşiktaş, because of a poor head-to-head record against those two teams.

League table

Results

Coaches

Below is the list of coaches who left their teams after the start of the season.

Statistics

Top goalscorers
 Last updated on 10 May 2008

Top assists
 Last updated on 21 December 2008

Hat-tricks

Kit and shirt sponsors

Stadiums

Kasımpaşa temporarily played their first 12 home matches at Atatürk Olympic Stadium, due to ongoing renovations at their home stadium. Her stadium's capacity was extended from 9,576 to 13, 5000 during the renovations.
Galatasaray temporarily played their first home match at Atatürk Olympic Stadium, due to ongoing renovations at their home stadium.

Teams promoted/relegated
The teams promoted from the TFF First League for the 2006–07 season:
Gençlerbirliği OFTAŞ (1st)
İstanbul B.B. (2nd)
Kasımpaşa S.K. (Play-off winner)
The teams relegated to the TFF First League for the 2006–07 season:
Sakaryaspor (18th)
Kayseri Erciyesspor (17th)
Antalyaspor (16th)

2007–08 fixtures
2008 Turkcell Super League Fixture List

weekly Turkish Turkcell Super League Reviews and news by Ahmet Turgut

References

External links 

Süper Lig seasons
Turkey
1